The Iowa Electronic Markets (IEM) are a group of real-money prediction markets/futures markets operated by the University of Iowa Tippie College of Business. Unlike normal futures markets, the IEM is not-for-profit; the markets are run for educational and research purposes.

The IEM allows traders to buy and sell contracts based on, among other things, political election results and economic indicators. Some markets are only available to academic traders.

The IEM has often been used to predict the results of political elections with a greater accuracy than traditional polls.

A precursor to the IEM was the Iowa Political Stock Market (IPSM), invented by George Neumann, and developed by Robert E. Forsythe, Forrest Nelson, and George Neumann.

How it works
Here are examples of contracts that the IEM traded, beginning June 6, 2006, concerning the 2008 U.S. Presidential Election Winner-Takes-All Market. (The contract descriptions came from the IEM site.)
DEM08_WTA
$1 if the Democratic Party nominee receives the majority of popular votes cast for the two major parties in the 2008 U.S. Presidential election, $0 otherwise
REP08_WTA
$1 if the Republican Party nominee receives the majority of popular votes cast for the two major parties in the 2008 U.S. Presidential election, $0 otherwise

On the first trading day in January, 2007, the DEM08_WTA contract sold for 52.2 cents.

At this point, a speculator has a number of options.
He can simply buy a number of DEM08_WTA shares and wait for the results of the election. If the Democratic Party nominee receives the majority of popular votes in the 2008 Presidential Election, the speculator would have his contract liquidated and receive $1, for a profit of 48¢. If the Democratic Party nominee did not receive the majority of popular votes in the Presidential Election, then the speculator would receive nothing.
Alternatively, he could have bought shares intending to sell them later (before the election and the resolution of the share values) for a greater amount.
Another option would be to essentially short sell DEM08_WTA shares - if one considers the price of DEM08_WTA to be too high and incommensurate with the true probability of the popular vote going to the Democratic nominee, one can buy a "bundle" for $1. In this case, the bundle would be 1 DEM08_WTA and 1 REP08_WTA; the value of these two shares is guaranteed to be $1 (as they will be cashed out as either worth $1 and $0, or $0 and $1). Hence to short sell, one would buy one bundle and then sell the overvalued items.
It is possible that a given market is simply irrationally priced. If the price of all the different shares is greater than or less than $1, then there is at least one share which is not correctly priced and so can either be shorted or gone long on. The price can be seen as the probability, and it doesn't make sense to have a total probability of greater than 100, and the markets are designed to cover all possibilities, so less than 100% doesn't make sense either. This is not necessarily true of all markets; in the Winner takes all markets this is true, but it is possible for the total value of 1 of every contract, which in 08_WTA is guaranteed to be $1, to exceed $1, such as in the markets dealing with share prices.

At the IEM site mentioned above, there was another bet on the 2008 U.S. Presidential Election, based on vote share, which, because its payoffs are between $0 and $1, has prices that are, on average, closer together. (See "Graphs" below in External links.)
UDEM08_VS
$1.00 times two-party vote share of unnamed Democratic nominee in 2008 election
UREP08_VS
$1.00 times two-party vote share of unnamed Republican nominee in 2008 election

The IEM also trades futures based on financial markets, such as whether the Fed Funds rate will be raised at the following meeting.

Rules and limits
The IEM is neither regulated by the U.S. Commodity Futures Trading Commission (CFTC) nor by any other agency due to its academic focus and the small sums that are involved. Indeed, the IEM has received two no-action letters that extend no‑action relief. A speculator may put at risk in the IEM only between $5 and $500. In contrast, other future markets like Nadex are regulated by the CFTC and allow speculators to take on or financially offset significant amounts of risk regarding economic events or the prices of commodities.

See also
The Wisdom of Crowds
NewsFutures
Intrade
TradeSports
PredictIt

References

Further reading
 Surowiecki, James (2004). The Wisdom of Crowds: Why the Many Are Smarter Than the Few and How Collective Wisdom Shapes Business, Economies, Societies and Nations Little, Brown 
 Thompson, Donald N. (2012). Oracles: How Prediction Markets Turn Employees into Visionaries Harvard Business Review Press

External links
The Iowa Electronic Markets website
Graphs for 2008 US Presidential Election Markets
A Market for Playing the 2 Candidates, (about the IPSM) The New York Times, 1992
The "Election Futures Market": More Accurate Than Polls?, Businessweek, 1996
Porkbellies and Politics, TheStreet.com, 2000
Bookies seen outbidding election polls: Betting sites better at predicting winner, economists claim, MSNBC, 2004
The Iowa Electronic Markets are still going for Bush, Salon.com, 2004
Iowa 'futures' show Republican weakness, CNN, 2006
PollyVote - Forecasting the U.S. Presidential Election

Prediction markets
University of Iowa